The 1999–2000 EHF Champions League was the 40th edition of Europe's premier club handball tournament.

Group stage

Group A

Group B

Group C

Group D

Knockout stage

Quarterfinals

Semifinals

Finals

References

External links 
 EHF Champions League website

EHF Champions League seasons
Champions League
Champions League